Laurie Ayton  may refer to two Scottish golfers:
Laurie Ayton Snr (1884–1962), Scottish golfer
Laurie Ayton Jnr (1914–1989), his son, Scottish golfer